Międzyrzecz is a town in western Poland, on the Obra and Paklica river, with 17,667 inhabitants (2020). The capital of Gmina Międzyrzecz and Międzyrzecz County. Since the Local Government Reorganization Act of 1998, it has been situated in Lubusz Voivodeship. In 1975–1998 Międzyrzecz was part of Gorzów Voivodeship. The town limits cover .

Geography

The town's name refers to Mesopotamia ("between rivers") and its location at the confluence of the Obra River and the Paklica tributary, in the west of the historic Greater Poland region.

The municipal area is in a particularly green part of Poland. Extensive forests and numerous lakes can be found in the vicinity, including two Natura 2000 protected areas south of the town.

Międzyrzecz is the seventh largest town in Lubusz Voivodeship. The number of inhabitants has slightly been on the decrease since the 1990s.

History

The settlement on the road leading from Magdeburg to Gniezno was first mentioned as Mezerici by the medieval chronicler Thietmar of Merseburg in the course of the 1005 campaign of King Henry II of Germany into the Polish lands of Duke Bolesław I Chrobry. The Old Polish name Mezyriecze first appeared in the 1112/16 Gesta principum Polonorum by Gallus Anonymus.

It remained a western outpost of the Duchy of Greater Poland, established by the 1138 Testament of Bolesław III Krzywousty, after the loss of Lubusz Land in the mid-13th century and was incorporated into the Poznań Voivodeship of the Polish Crown upon the coronation of King Władysław I the Elbow-high in 1320. Under the rule of his successor Casimir III the Great (1333–1370) German settlers began to migrate into the area in the course of the Ostsiedlung. Town privileges were confirmed by King Casimir IV Jagiellon in 1485. Międzyrzecz was a royal town of the Polish Crown and the seat of starosts (local royal administrators). In 1520 it was ravaged by the Germans.

The town remained part of the Polish–Lithuanian Commonwealth until in the Second Partition of Poland of 1793 it was annexed together with the whole region of Greater Poland by the Kingdom of Prussia. The town at first was part of the South Prussia province, was ceded to the Poznań Department of the Napoleonic Duchy of Warsaw by the 1807 Treaties of Tilsit, and upon the 1815 Congress of Vienna fell back to Prussia, administrated within the Grand Duchy of Posen. In 1818 the town became the capital of the Prussian Kreis Meseritz within Regierungsbezirk Posen. After the failed Greater Poland Uprising of 1848, it was incorporated into the Province of Posen, which, with Prussia, became part of the unified German Empire in 1871. According to a 1900 census, 20.2% of the population were Polish native speakers.

20th century
After World War I, upon the Greater Poland Uprising of 1918/19 and according to the Treaty of Versailles, the town was part of the small, mostwestern part of Greater Poland which remained part of Weimar Germany. From 1922 these lands, located close to the border with the Second Polish Republic, were administrated as the Prussian Province of Posen-West Prussia. Meseritz became the seat of the Landeshauptmann governor, until in 1938 the province was dissolved and Meseritz was incorporated into the Province of Brandenburg. From 1934 to 1938, the Nazi administration had the Festungsfront Oder-Warthe-Bogen fortifications erected in the south of the town. During World War II, in Obrawalde (present-day Obrzyce within the city limits), from 1942 to 1945, Germans murdered over 10,000 people, mostly mentally ill and disabled, as part of the Aktion T4, but also prisoners of war and political opponents.

In the late days of World War II, Meseritz was occupied by Red Army forces in the course of the Vistula–Oder Offensive on 31 January 1945. Left to the Republic of Poland, it was incorporated into Poznań Voivodeship on July 7. The town's re-incorporation to Poland was confirmed with the Potsdam Agreement and the implementation of the Oder–Neisse line. While the Polish autochthonous minority was allowed to remain in Międzyrzecz, the German speaking majority was expelled. Poles of whom a part had been expelled or left from former Kresy territories, annexed by the Soviet Union, re-settled the town.

Sport
MKS Orzeł Międzyrzecz (founded April 15, 1945) – men's football club (Polish league level 6)
KS Orzeł Międzyrzecz – men's volleyball club (Polish league level 3)
MKT Tenis Club Poland-Orzeł Międzyrzecz (founded November 15, 1993) – men's and women's tennis club
MSBS Międzyrzecz – men's duplicate bridge club
MTB MOSiW Międzyrzecz – men's and women's cycling (mountain biking) club

Notable people
Christian Samuel Theodor Bernd (1775–1854), linguist and heraldist
 Adolph Kullak (1823–1862), pianist and musicologist
Rudolf E. A. Havenstein (1857–1923), director of the Reichsbank
Peter Berling (1934–2017), actor and writer
Dawid Murek (born 1977), volleyball player
Rafał Maślak (born 1989), male model
Kamil Jóźwiak (born 1998), footballer

Twin towns – sister cities
See twin towns of Gmina Międzyrzecz.

See also
Regenwurmlager

References

External links
Official website of the town and municipality 
Official website of the town office 

Cities and towns in Lubusz Voivodeship
Międzyrzecz County